HMS Sidon was a submarine of the Royal Navy, launched in September 1944, one of the third group of S class built by Cammell Laird & Co Limited, Birkenhead, named after the naval bombardment of Sidon in 1840. An explosion caused by a faulty torpedo sank her in Portland Harbour with the loss of 13 lives.

Accident
In 1953 she took part in the Fleet Review to celebrate the Coronation of Queen Elizabeth II.

On the morning of 16 June 1955, Sidon was moored alongside the depot ship  in Portland Harbour. Two  Mark 12 high test peroxide-powered torpedoes, code-named "Fancy", had been loaded aboard for testing. Fifty-six officers and crewmen were aboard.

At 08:25, an explosion in one of the "Fancy" torpedoes (but not the warhead) burst the number-three torpedo tube into which it had been loaded and ruptured the two forward-most watertight bulkheads. Fire, toxic gases, and smoke accompanied the blast. Twelve men in the forward compartments died instantly and seven others were seriously injured.

The submarine started to settle by the bow with a list to starboard, and her commanding officer, Lieutenant Commander Verry, ordered the submarine evacuated from the engine room and aft escape hatches.  Thanks to a rescue party from Maidstone, everyone not immediately killed escaped, except Maidstones medical officer, Temporary Surgeon Lieutenant Charles Eric Rhodes.  He had gone aboard with the rescue party, assisted several survivors, and suffocated because he was using a DSEA set that he had not been trained to use.  At about 08:50 Sidon sank to the bottom of the harbour. On 1 November 1955 Rhodes was posthumously awarded the Albert Medal for putting his life in danger to save others.

One week later the wreck was raised and towed into a causeway on Chesil Beach. The bodies of the 13 casualties were removed and buried with full honours in the Portland Royal Naval Cemetery overlooking the harbour.

A court of inquiry cleared anyone aboard Sidon for the loss of the boat. The direct cause of the accident was determined to have been malfunctioning of the "Fancy" torpedo. A torpedo being readied for the morning test shot had begun a "hot-run" - its engine had started while it was still inside the submarine and was over-speeding, creating very high pressures in its fuel system.  The "Fancy" torpedo used high test peroxide (HTP) as an oxidizer.  When an oxidizer line burst, HTP sprayed onto the copper fittings inside the torpedo, decomposing into oxygen and steam.  The torpedo's warhead did not detonate, but its hull burst violently, rupturing the torpedo tube and causing the flooding that destroyed the boat.  The torpedo programme was terminated and the torpedoes taken out of use by 1959.

On the 50th anniversary of the Sidon accident, 16 June 2005, the Dorset Branch of the Submariners Association erected a Memorial Stone to those who died.  This is situated adjacent to the Portland Cenotaph at Portland, opposite the Portland Heights Hotel. A number of survivors and relatives of those who died in the accident attended the ceremony.

Sidons wreck was purchased from the Ministry of Defence by the company Deepquest Sub Sea in 2000. In 2002 the company announced that it intended to raise the wreck. This had not occurred as of 2021.

See also
 Submarines destroyed by hot-running torpedoes:

Russian submarine K-141 Kursk
Possibly

References

Publications

External links
 HMS Sidon War Memorial
 HMS Sidon War Memorial at Portland, Dorset

 

Explosions in 1955
British submarine accidents
Submarine accidents caused by torpedoes
British S-class submarines (1931)
Ships built on the River Mersey
Shipwrecks in the English Channel
Maritime incidents in 1955
Wreck diving sites in the United Kingdom
High-test peroxide
Explosions in England
1944 ships
World War II submarines of the United Kingdom
Ships sunk as targets
Maritime incidents in 1957
1957 disasters in the United Kingdom
Disasters in Dorset